Flik may refer to:
 Flik, an ant in the 1998 Disney/Pixar animated film A Bug's Life
Flik (Suikoden), a character in videogame Suikoden 
Flik (unit), a unit in radio-astronomy
 Flik 10, an air company of Hungary
 Flik 14, an air company of Hungary

See also
Flik and Flok (disambiguation)
Flick (disambiguation)
Flok (disambiguation)